Claudio Darío Biaggio (born 2 July 1967) is an Argentine football manager and former player who played as a striker. He is the current manager of Bolivian club Always Ready.

During his professional career he played for important clubs in Argentina (Belgrano, San Lorenzo de Almagro and Colón de Santa Fe), Uruguay (Peñarol and Danubio), France (Girondins de Bordeaux), Japan (Avispa Fukuoka), Ecuador (Deportivo Cuenca) and Bolivia (Oriente Petrolero). He also earned one cap with the Argentina national team in 1995.

Coaching career

San Lorenzo
Born in Santa Rosa, La Pampa, Biaggio started his coaching career as a youth coach in San Lorenzo, before he was named manager of San Lorenzo's reserve team in January 2014.

On 22 November 2017, Biaggio was named interim manager of San Lorenzo for the rest of 2017, after the departure of Diego Aguirres. In December 2017, he was named permanently manager of the club. However, he decided to step back at the end of October 2018 after a defeat to Club Atlético Temperley. During the 2017/2018 season, Biaggio led 43 games, won 19, drew 13 and lost 11.

Chacarita Juniors
On 28 February 2020, Biaggio was appointed manager of Chacarita Juniors.

Career statistics

Club

International

References

External links
 

 
 Argentine Primera statistics at Fútbol XXI  

1967 births
Living people
Argentine footballers
Argentine expatriate footballers
Argentina international footballers
Argentine people of Italian descent
Association football forwards
Argentine Primera División players
Club Atlético Belgrano footballers
Peñarol players
Danubio F.C. players
San Lorenzo de Almagro footballers
FC Girondins de Bordeaux players
Expatriate footballers in France
Ligue 1 players
Club Atlético Colón footballers
Argentine expatriate sportspeople in Uruguay
Avispa Fukuoka players
Expatriate footballers in Japan
J1 League players
Argentine expatriate sportspeople in Japan
C.D. Cuenca footballers
Oriente Petrolero players
Expatriate footballers in Bolivia
Expatriate footballers in Ecuador
Expatriate footballers in Uruguay
Argentine expatriate sportspeople in Bolivia
Argentine expatriate sportspeople in France
Estudiantes de Río Cuarto footballers
Uruguayan Primera División players
Argentine expatriate sportspeople in Ecuador
Argentine football managers
San Lorenzo de Almagro managers
Chacarita Juniors managers
The Strongest managers
Club Always Ready managers
People from Santa Rosa, La Pampa
Expatriate football managers in Bolivia